Selvanagar, otherwise popularly known as MoonRoad (which is derived from the Tamil word 3roadu), is an industrial town which is located in Erode District in the state of Tamil Nadu. It houses numerous cotton mills besides having a strong number of farmers and weavers.

Places of interest
 Moonroad
 Unjakattu Valasu
 Chathirakattu Valasu
 Vinayaka Temple
 ChinnaThandampalayam
 Sivalingapuram
 Valliampalayam
 Pudur
 Kandasamypalayam
 Thandampalayam

Villages in Erode district